Ida Ivanka Kubler (born January 3, 1978) is an international artist based in New York.

Work
Kubler's artwork features recycled materials and other objects, including silk cocoons, feathers, tree branches and other materials. Color is an inspiration to Kubler and her work. The genre of her work is a blend of Abstract Expressionism and Color Field painting. In her early years she practiced painting in a naturalistic realistic manner, focusing mostly on figures, portraits, still life and landscapes. Her style evolved as she experimented with different theories, techniques, and ideas.
 
Kubler is best known for her series The Birth of an Idea. These artworks have been described as "Organic in appearance; abstract in presence. They have a being and an atmosphere that transmits to the viewer calmness and vibrancy at once. I felt touched and enlightened." 'The Birth of an Idea' was included in 'Placebos for Art' a project undertaken by the Behring Institute for Medical Research and was judged to have positive influence on public health. The simple circle settings consisting of an abundance of sculptured silk cocoons on a large canvas. The cocoons are painted, manipulated and positioned. Ida has created two and three colour versions of the series, some with additional elements like ink markings or red and blue dots. "The art is at once transcendentally primitive embodying a universal oneness of geometric circle, with a subtle play of patterns. A reinvention of Indian Mandalas or reminiscent of mosaic in Ancient Greece, an assemblage and repetition of small particles. In modern parlance the repetition in Kubler’s artwork could be seen as deconstructed pixelation."

In addition, Kubler has developed two other series. The “Non Material” series. These are paintings, oil on canvas, depicting scenes on the border between abstraction and realism and are dreamy-ghost-like paintings. And “The Thing” series, oil on canvas, which are half-abstract figurative series of nudes walking in the nothingness.

Notable exhibitions
Kubler has exhibited in New York (Chinatown Soup Gallery, May 2016 ; Sohotel Artspace April 2015 ; Dejavu Gallery previously Bodley Gallery November 2015), Malaga, Spain (Stoa Gallery, December 2015) and London (Store Street Gallery April 2013; Chance Gallery, October 2013.

References 

Living people
American contemporary artists
Artists from New York City
1978 births
Alumni of Chelsea College of Arts
Bulgarian painters
Bulgarian women painters
Contemporary painters